Joel Johnson is a journalist and media personality, the founding editor of The Consumerist. He is a contributing editor at The Wirecutter, and a former editor of Boing Boing, Wired, former editorial director at Gawker Media, and Animal NY. In 2013, he co-hosted The Gadget Testers on BBC America. As editor of Gizmodo, Johnson won the 2005 Bloggie Award for Best Technology Website.

References

External links
 
 An interview with Joel Johnson
 1 Million Workers. 90 Million iPhones. 17 Suicides. Who’s to Blame?

American male bloggers
American bloggers
Living people
21st-century American non-fiction writers
Year of birth missing (living people)